The men's floor competition at the 2015 Southeast Asian Games was held on 9 June 2015 at the Bishan Sports Hall in Singapore.

Schedule
All times are Singapore Standard Time (UTC+8).

Qualification

Qualification took place on 6 June 2015 as part of the team and individual qualification event.

Results

References

External links 

Men's floor